Ravela Joseph (born 1937) is a Priest of the Protestant Samavesam of Telugu Baptist Churches (STBC) with over 50 years of ecclesiastical ministry, much of which was into Spiritual formation, having taught at the Andhra Christian Theological College, Secunderabad, Telangana (India).

Studies and academics

Propadeutic studies
The American Baptist Mission/Samavesam of Telugu Baptist Churches was one of the Protestant missions that began its Christian mission in the early nineteenth century in India whose south India ministries were headquartered in Ramayapatnam in Andhra Pradesh.  R. Joseph evinced interest in pursuing Priesthood as a full time vocation and underwent Spiritual formation at the historic Baptist Theological Seminary, Ramayapatnam studying under the Principalship of The Rev. Maurice Blanchard and other faculty comprising The Rev. G. Solomon.  The seminary was directly affiliated to the Senate of Serampore College (University) and Joseph was awarded the graduate degree of B.D. in 1967 from the Seminary President, Louis F. Knoll after which he was assigned a teaching role in that Seminary.

Research studies

United States: Newton
In 1972, The Council of the Ramayapatnam Baptist Theological Seminary, Ramayapatnam and the Samavesam of Telugu Baptist Churches sent R. Joseph to the Andover Newton Theological School, Newton for postgraduate studies where he earned a Master of Sacred Theology (S.T.M.) degree and on his return continued to teach at the Seminary which by then had integrated its B. D. section into the Andhra Christian Theological College and R. Joseph was reassigned to teach there by the Samavesam of Telugu Baptist Churches.

India: Bangalore
In 1978, the Samavesam of Telugu Baptist Churches had accorded study leave to R. Joseph who went to the United Theological College, Bangalore to upgrade his S. T. M. obtained from the United States to  Master of Theology (M. Th.) degree and researched on the writings of Puroshottam Choudhary under the supervision of Joshua Russell Chandran and Eric J. Lott, his Professors.  Joseph's companions at the college included G. Devakadasham, G. D. V. Prasad and others.

By 1980, R. Joseph rejoined Andhra Christian Theological College and resumed his teaching responsibilities.  Again in 1983, he returned to the United Theological College, Bangalore to undertake doctoral studies but had to leave it midway as he was called to teach at his alma mater the Baptist Theological Seminary, Ramayapatnam from where he again joined the Andhra Christian Theological College.

General studies
In 1985, R. Joseph enrolled at the State-run Osmania University from where he studied Master of Arts.

Teaching

Andhra Pradesh
Soon after R. Joseph completed his graduate studies in 1967 at the Ramayapatnam Baptist Theological Seminary, Ramayapatnam, he was assigned a teaching assignment.  By this time, efforts among the Protestants to form a unified seminary gained credence leading to the formation of the Andhra Christian Theological College in 1964 Rajahmundry by,

 the Baptists of the Convention of Baptist Churches of Northern Circars,
 the Lutherans of the Andhra Evangelical Lutheran Church and the South Andhra Lutheran Church, 
 the Methodists of the Methodist Church in India,
 the Anglicans, Congregationalists and the Wesleyans of the Church of South India

However, compared to the Ramayapatnam Baptist Theological Seminary which was entitled to admit students for the Bachelor of Divinity degree courses - that too with English as the medium of instruction, the new unified Protestant seminary offered only Licentiate in Theology level courses in Telugu medium.  The Samavesam of Telugu Baptist Churches was way ahead of its times both in terms of the academic credentials of its faculty as well as its affiliation to the Senate of Serampore College (University).  Though the Baptists of the Samavesam of Telugu Baptist Churches were in favour of joining the new unified Protestant initiative in Rajahmundry, the integration did not seem ripe at that stage.  R. Joseph had just finished his graduate studies at Ramayapatnam in 1967 and just at that time his Principal, The Rev. Maurice Blanchard and his successor The Rev. Louis F. Knoll decided to experiment and moved their B.D. section from Ramayapatnam to Rajahmundry and functioned as a separate entity within the premises of the Andhra Christian Theological College in Rajahmundry.  R. Joseph's teaching companions, K. Wilson, K. S. Prasada Rao, Tracy G. Gipson, Alice M. Findlay, B. R. Moses and Louis F. Knoll moved to Rajahmundry while G. Solomon, S. Joseph, P. Joseph  and D. Daniel joined later.

In his second phase at Ramayapatnam, R. Joseph rejoined the seminary in 1984 taking up the Presidentship of the Seminary which was training Catechetists to take up rural evangelism and R. Joseph took responsibility to build up the seminary and stayed in Ramayapatnam until 1994 when he finally moved again to Hyderabad.

Telangana
By 1972, the Samavesam of Telugu Baptist Churches fully integrated its B.D. section into the Andhra Christian Theological College which by then was relocated to Hyderabad.  R. Joseph was sent on study leave to the United States to upgrade his studies to enable him to take up teaching at the unified Protestant Theologiate in Hyderabad and returned in 1973 to take up teaching of Theology.  On his return, R. Joseph joined the Andhra Christian Theological College which was by then led by the Old Testament Scholar Victor Premasagar while his other companions from Ramayapatnam continued to teach there who included S. Joseph, G. Solomon, K. S. Prasada Rao, and Tracy G. Gipson.

While this was so, K. Wilson had by that time left the Office of the Priesthood moving to the State-run Osmania University to take up teaching of the Philosophy as a civilian.  After teaching for nearly six years at the Andhra Christian Theological College, R. Joseph had to revisit his academics to tune up his postgraduate degree earned in the United States to suit the requirements of the Senate of Serampore College (University) and left for Bangalore in 1978, rejoining the College in 1980 and taught for nearly three more years till 1983 when he went on study leave to his alma mater at Bangalore.

After a gap of nearly a decade, R. Joseph rejoined the Andhra Christian Theological College in 1994 which by then was led by Rev. R. Yesurathnam, the Principal and R. Joseph continued to teach Theology for the aspirants until he retired on attaining superannuation in 2003.

R. Joseph's students at the Ramayapatnam Baptist Theological Seminary, Ramayapatnam and the Andhra Christian Theological College have substantially contributed to the growth of Christianity in India and include,
 Bishop Emeritus Thalari Samuel Kanaka Prasad, CSI-Bishop Emeritus - in - Medak,
The Right Reverend Boyineni Deva Prasada Rao, CSI-Bishop - in - Rayalaseema,
The Right Reverend Eggoni Pushpalalitha, CSI-Bishop - in - Nandyal,
The Right Reverend Vadapalli Prasada Rao, CSI-Bishop - in - Dornakal,

Writings
R. Joseph has been a Teacher of Christian Theology and a prolific writer contributing to theological writings.
 In 1973, The American Baptist Mission among the Telugus,- This book is a postgraduate thesis of R. Joseph published by the School in Newton.  In 2003, R. Joseph's postgraduate thesis was revised and printed in India under the title A History of the Telugu Baptist Churches (American Baptist Mission), Andhra Christian Theological College, Hyderabad.
 In 1993, Bibliography of Original Christian Writings in India in Telugu (with B. Suneel Bhanu), - During the tenure of D. S. Satyaranjan at the Senate of Serampore College (University), bibliography of original Christian writings were undertaken to compile such writings in the vernacular writings in the post-Vatican context.
 In 2004, Bhakti Theology of Puroshottam Choudhary,- The influence of the Bhakti Movement had touched Christian writings and lyrics.  R. Joseph had researched on the lyrics of Puroshottam Choudhary who belonged to the Convention of Baptist Churches of Northern Circars Church Society.  In 2011, James Elisha Taneti in History of the Telugu Christians: A Bibliography published by Scarecrow, Plymouth writes that Ravela Joseph book on the life of Puroshottam Choudhary had been to analyse his contribution as an early Indian Christian to Christology.
 In 2013, Christian Theology (in Telugu),
In 2012, the Oxford Encyclopedia of South Asian Christianity (edited by Roger E. Hedlund) included five articles contributed by R. Joseph,
 on Puroshottam Choudhary, CBCNC,
 on Chetty Bhanumurthy, CBCNC,
 on Paraiah Yerraguntla,
 on Samavesam of Telugu Baptist Churches

Reminiscences
Talathoti Punnaiah who underwent a 1-year spirituality course in 1969 at the Ramayapatnam Baptist Theological Seminary at Ramayapatnam as an Aspirant to discern his avocation towards religious life writes that,

Further reading

References

Indian Baptists
Indian Christian theologians
Telugu people
1937 births
Senate of Serampore College (University) alumni
Osmania University alumni
20th-century translators
Living people
Academic staff of the Senate of Serampore College (University)
Andover Newton Theological School alumni
People from Guntur